The 2016 United States House of Representatives elections in Pennsylvania were held on November 8, 2016, to elect the 18 U.S. representatives from the Commonwealth of Pennsylvania, one from each of the state's 18 congressional districts. The elections coincided with the 2016 U.S. presidential election, as well as other elections to the House of Representatives, elections to the United States Senate and various state and local elections. The primaries were held on April 26.

Overview

District 1

The 1st district included central and South Philadelphia, the City of Chester, the Philadelphia International Airport and other small sections of Delaware County.The incumbent was Democrat Bob Brady, who had represented the district since 1998. He was re-elected with 83% of the vote in 2014 and the district had a PVI of D+28.

Democratic primary
Brady was unopposed for the Democratic nomination. Bryan Leib had filed with the FEC and announced his intention to challenge Brady for the Democratic nomination in July 2015, but did not file to run.

Candidates

Nominee
Bob Brady, incumbent U.S. Representative

Withdrawn
Bryan Leib

Primary results

Republican primary

Candidates

Nominee
Debbie Williams

Primary results

General election

Endorsements

Results

District 2

The 2nd district includes parts of West Philadelphia, North Philadelphia and Northwest Philadelphia in addition to Lower Merion Township in Montgomery County. Incumbent Chaka Fattah, who had represented the district since 1995, was re-elected with 88% of the vote in 2014 and the district has a PVI of D+38.

Democratic primary
Fattah was defeated in the Democratic primary by state Representative Dwight E. Evans.

Candidates

Nominee
 Dwight E. Evans, state representative, candidate for governor in 1994 and candidate for Mayor of Philadelphia in 1999 and 2007

Eliminated in primary
 Chaka Fattah, incumbent U.S. Representative
 Brian Gordon, Lower Merion Township commissioner and candidate for PA-06 in 2010
 Dan Muroff, Philadelphia's 9th Ward Democratic Leader and former congressional aide

Withdrawn
 Brian Sims, state representative

Endorsements

Primary results

Republican primary

Candidates

Nominee
James Jones, human-resources consulting firm owner

Primary results

Special election
On June 23, 2016, two days after being convicted of 22 corruption charges, Fattah resigned his seat in Congress. On July 1, 2016, Governor Tom Wolf announced that a special election would be held on November 8, concurrently with the regularly-scheduled election, to fill Fattah's seat for the final eight weeks of the 114th United States Congress.

Candidates
Democrats
 Dwight E. Evans, state representative, candidate for governor in 1994 and candidate for Mayor of Philadelphia in 1999 and 2007

Republicans
 James Jones, human-resources consulting firm owner

Independents
 Milton Street, former state senator and candidate for Mayor of Philadelphia in 2007, 2011 and 2015

Results

General election

Endorsements

Results

District 3

The 3rd district was in Northwestern Pennsylvania and included the cities of Erie, Sharon, Hermitage, Butler and Meadville. The incumbent was Republican Mike Kelly, who had represented the district since 2011. He was re-elected with 61% of the vote in 2014 and the district had a PVI of R+8.

Republican primary

Candidates

Nominee
Mike Kelly, incumbent U.S. Representative

Primary results

General election

Results

District 4

The 4th district was in South Central Pennsylvania and included all of Adams and York counties and parts of Cumberland County. The incumbent was Republican Scott Perry, who has represented the district since 2013. He was elected with 75% of the vote in 2014 and the district had a PVI of R+9.

Republican primary

Candidates

Nominee
Scott Perry, incumbent U.S. Representative

Primary results

Democratic primary

Candidates

Nominee
Josh Burkholder, multimedia digital artist

General election

Results

District 5

The 5th district, the state's largest and most sparsely populated, was in North Central Pennsylvania and included all of Cameron, Centre, Clarion, Clinton, Elk, Forest, Huntingdon, Jefferson, McKean and Potter counties and parts of Clearfield, Crawford, Erie, Tioga, Warren and Venango counties. The incumbent was Republican Glenn Thompson, who had represented the district since 2009. He was re-elected with 64% of the vote in 2014 and the district had a PVI of R+8.

Republican primary

Candidates

Nominee
Glenn Thompson, incumbent U.S. Representative

Primary results

Democratic primary

Candidates

Nominee
Kerith Strano Taylor, family law attorney and nominee for this seat in 2014

Primary results

General election

Endorsements

Results

District 6

The 6th district included communities north and west of the City of Philadelphia. The incumbent was Republican Ryan Costello, who had represented the district since 2015. He was elected with 56% of the vote in 2014, succeeding retiring Republican Jim Gerlach, and the district had a PVI of R+2.

Republican primary

Candidates

Nominee
Ryan Costello, incumbent U.S. Representative

Primary results

Democratic primary

Candidates

Nominee
 Mike Parrish, businessman, retired US Army colonel and candidate for this seat in 2014

Withdrawn
 Lindy Li, financial manager (failed to qualify for ballot placement)

Endorsements

Primary results

General election

Endorsements

Predictions

Results

District 7

The 7th district was in the Philadelphia suburbs, including most of Delaware County along with portions of Chester, Montgomery, Berks and Lancaster counties. The incumbent was Republican Pat Meehan, who had represented the district since 2011. He was re-elected with 62% of the vote in 2014 and the district had a PVI of R+2.

Republican primary

Candidates

Nominee
Pat Meehan, incumbent U.S. Representative

Eliminated in primary
Stan Casacio, businessman and former Cheltenham Town Councilman

Primary results

Democratic primary

Candidates

Nominee
 Mary Ellen Balchunis, college professor and nominee for this seat in 2014

Eliminated in primary
 Bill Golderer, pastor and founder of Broad Street Ministry

Withdrawn
 Lindy Li, financial analyst (running for PA-06)
 Dave Naples, database administrator, 2007 candidate for Skippack Township Board of Supervisors and 2014 write-in candidate for governor (running for state house)

Endorsements

Primary results

General election

Endorsements

Results

District 8

The 8th district was in Southeastern Pennsylvania and included Bucks County, along with portions of Montgomery County. The incumbent was Republican Mike Fitzpatrick, who had represented the district since 2011, and previously represented it from 2005 to 2007. He was re-elected with 62% of the vote in 2014 and the district had a PVI of R+1.

Republican primary
Fitzpatrick, a supporter of term limits, had pledged to limit himself to four terms in the House and did not run for re-election.

Candidates

Nominee
 Brian Fitzpatrick, retired FBI agent and brother of Congressman Mike Fitzpatrick

Eliminated in primary
 Marc Duome, psychologist and businessman
 Andy Warren, former Bucks County Commissioner

Withdrawn
 Dean Malik, former Bucks County Assistant District Attorney and candidate in 2010
 Scott Petri, state representative
 Brian Thomas, marketing consultant

Declined
 Jim Cawley, former lieutenant governor 
 Gene DiGirolamo, state representative
 Mike Fitzpatrick, incumbent U.S. Representative
 Rob Loughery, Bucks County Commissioner
 Tom Manion, businessman and nominee in 2008
 Chuck McIlhinney, state senator

Primary results

Democratic primary

Candidates

Nominee
 Steve Santarsiero, state representative

Eliminated in primary
 Shaughnessy Naughton, chemist, businesswoman and candidate for this seat in 2014

Declined
 Diane Marseglia, Bucks County Commissioner (endorsed Santarsiero)
 Patrick Murphy, former U.S. Representative and candidate for attorney general in 2012
 Kevin Strouse, United States Army Ranger and nominee for this seat in 2014 (endorsed Santarsiero)

Endorsements

Primary results

General election

Endorsements

Polling

Predictions

Results

District 9

The 9th district was in South Central Pennsylvania and included Cambria, Blair, Huntingdon, Franklin, Fulton, Bedford, Somerset, Fayette, Greene and Washington counties. The incumbent was Republican Bill Shuster, who had represented the district since 2001. He was re-elected with 64% of the vote in 2014 and the district had a PVI of R+14.

Republican primary
Shuster, the chairman of the House Committee on Transportation and Infrastructure, was challenged in the 2014 Republican primary by two candidates, Art Halvorson and Travis Schooley, unhappy with his support for earmarks that bring projects to the district. Halvorson and Schooley both were considering running again.

On April 24, 2015, The Hill reported that businessman Tom Smith, who self-funded a 2012 U.S. Senate campaign, was considering a primary challenge of Shuster. Halvorson had pledged that he would not run if Smith did and would support him. In July, Smith announced he would not run, citing unexpected health concerns. After Smith declined to run, Halvorson announced he would run again. On October 17, 2015, Smith died.

Candidates

Nominee
Bill Shuster, incumbent U.S. Representative

Eliminated in primary
Art Halvorson, businessman, Coast Guard veteran and candidate for this seat in 2014

Declined
Tom Smith, businessman and nominee for U.S. Senate in 2012

Endorsements

Primary results

Democratic primary
While no Democrat appeared on the ballot, Arthur Halvorson, who lost in the Republican primary, received enough Democratic write-in votes to be the Democratic nominee; Halvorson vowed to caucus as a conservative Republican if elected.

General election

Results

District 10

The 10th district was in Northeastern Pennsylvania and included Monroe, Pike, Lackawanna, Wayne, Susquehanna, Bradford, Tioga, Sullivan, Lycoming, Union, Columbia, Snyder, Mifflin, Juniata and Perry counties. The incumbent was Republican Tom Marino, who had represented the district since 2011. He was re-elected with 63% of the vote in 2014.

Republican primary

Candidates

Nominee
Tom Marino, incumbent U.S. Representative

Primary results

Democratic primary
After no candidate stepped forward initially to run for the seat, three write in candidates announced to vie for the Democratic nomination. Former Lewisburg Mayor and environmental consultant, Mike Molesevich, Bucknell graduate student, Steve Belskie, and Justin Sheare all sought the Democratic nomination.

Candidates

Nominee
Mike Molesevich, former Mayor of Lewisburg and environmental consultant

Jerry Kaines, a Lycoming County building materials salesman, had formed an exploratory committee for a potential Independent campaign.

General election

Results

District 11

The 11th district was in Northeastern Pennsylvania and included Wyoming, Luzerne, Columbia, Carbon, Northumberland, Dauphin, Perry and Cumberland counties. The incumbent was Republican Lou Barletta, who had represented the district since 2011. He was re-elected with 66% of the vote in 2014 and the district had a PVI of R+6.

Republican primary

Candidates

Nominee
Lou Barletta, incumbent U.S. Representative

Primary results

Democratic primary

Candidates

Nominee
Michael Marsicano, former Mayor of Hazleton

Primary results

General election

Endorsements

Results

District 12

The 12th district was in Southwestern Pennsylvania and included all of Beaver County and parts of Allegheny, Cambria, Lawrence, Somerset and Westmoreland counties. The incumbent was Republican Keith Rothfus, who had represented the district since 2013. He was re-elected with 59% of the vote in 2014. The district had a PVI of R+9.

Republican primary

Candidates

Nominee
Keith Rothfus, incumbent U.S. Representative

Primary results

Democratic primary

Candidates

Nominee
Erin McClelland, psychologist, businesswoman and nominee for this seat in 2014

Withdrawn
Steve Larchuk, attorney, renewable energy business owner and candidate for the 4th district in 2004

Endorsements

Primary results

General election

Results

District 13

The 13th district was in Southeastern Pennsylvania, covering eastern Montgomery County and Northeast Philadelphia. The incumbent was Democrat Brendan Boyle, who had represented the district since 2015. He was elected with 67% of the vote in 2014, succeeding retiring Democrat Allyson Schwartz, and the district had a PVI of D+13.

Democratic primary

Candidates

Nominee
Brendan Boyle, incumbent U.S. Representative

Primary results

Republican primary

Candidates

Nominee
Armond James

General election

Endorsements

Results

District 14

The 14th district included the entire city of Pittsburgh and parts of surrounding suburbs.T he incumbent was Democrat Michael F. Doyle, who had represented the district since 2003, and previously represented the 18th district from 1995 to 2003. He was re-elected with 84% of the vote in the primary and unopposed in the general in 2014; the district had a PVI of D+15.

Democratic primary
Doyle was challenged for the Democratic nomination by Janis Brooks, who ran against him in 2012 and 2014.

Candidates

Nominee
Michael F. Doyle, incumbent U.S. Representative

Eliminated in primary
Janis C. Brooks, pastor, CEO/founder of Citizens to Abolish Domestic Apartheid and candidate for this seat in 2012 and 2014

Endorsements

Primary results

Republican primary

Candidates

Nominee
Lenny McAllister, political commentator and candidate for Illinois's 2nd congressional district in 2013

General election

Endorsements

Results

District 15

The 15th district was in Eastern Pennsylvania and included Lehigh County and parts of Berks, Dauphin, Lebanon and Northampton counties.
The incumbent was Republican Charlie Dent, who had represented the district since 2005. He was re-elected unopposed in 2014 and the district had a PVI of R+2.

Republican primary

Candidates

Nominee
 Charlie Dent, incumbent U.S. Representative

Primary results

Democratic primary

Candidates

Nominee
 Rick Daugherty, former chair of the Lehigh County Democratic Party and nominee for this seat in 2012

Withdrawn
David A. Clark
Laura Quick

Declined
Archie Follweiler, former Kutztown Borough councilman and state house candidate in 2006

Primary results

General election

Endorsements

Results

District 16

The 16th district was in Southeastern Pennsylvania, just west of Philadelphia and included a large portion of southern Chester County, most of Lancaster County and a sliver of Berks County, including the city of Reading. The incumbent was Republican Joe Pitts, who had represented the district since 1997. He was re-elected with 58% of the vote in 2014 and the district had a PVI of R+4. Pitts did not run for re-election.

Republican primary

Candidates

Nominee
 Lloyd Smucker, state senator

Eliminated in primary
 Jeffrey Bartos
 Chet Beiler, former chair of the Lancaster County Republican Committee, candidate for lieutenant governor in 2010 and nominee for auditor general in 2008
 Craig Davis
 Thomas Wentzel
 Brad Witmer

Declined
 Joe Pitts, incumbent U.S. Representative

Primary results

Democratic primary

Candidates

Nominee
 Christina Hartman, former nonprofit executive

Withdrawn
 Raj Kittappa, stem cell researcher and candidate fir this seat in 2014
 Gary Wegman, dentist

Endorsements

Primary results

General election

Endorsements

Predictions

Results

District 17

The 17th district was in Eastern Pennsylvania and included Schuylkill, Carbon, Monroe, Luzerne and Lackawanna counties. The incumbent was Democrat Matt Cartwright, who had represented the district since 2013. He was re-elected with 57% of the vote in 2014 and the district had a PVI of D+4.

Democratic primary

Candidates

Nominee
 Matt Cartwright , incumbent U.S. Representative

Primary results

Republican primary

Candidates

Nominee
 Matt Connolly, sports car racing team owner and candidate for this seat in 2014

Eliminated in primary
Glenn Geissinger, Northampton County Councilman

Primary results

General election

Endorsements

Results

District 18

The 18th district was in the southern suburbs of Pittsburgh and included parts of Allegheny, Washington, Greene and Westmoreland counties. The incumbent was Republican Tim Murphy, who had represented the district since 2003. He was re-elected unopposed in 2014 and the district had a PVI of R+10.

Republican primary

Candidates

Nominee
Tim Murphy, incumbent U.S. Representative

Primary results

General election

Endorsements

Results

References

External links
U.S. House elections in Pennsylvania, 2016 at Ballotpedia
Campaign contributions at OpenSecrets

Pennsylvania
2016
2016 Pennsylvania elections